The word Gong Nui, or Gong neoi can be directly translated to "Hong Kong Girls" and is commonly used on Hong Kong Internet forums as well as in the press. It represents a negative stereotype portraying Hong Kong women as worshiping money, narcissistic, being obsessed with foreign culture, and suffering from the so-called "Princess Syndrome" which means girls or non-married women requesting others to treat her like a princess.

History

Past 
"Gong nui" was a neutral word used to describe ordinary Hong Kong women. Hong Kong women were usually compared with Chinese women and Taiwanese women due to the Chinese family background and similar Chinese sociocultural background. In the past, compared to women in South East Asian countries, Hong Kong women were described as being independent, subjective and ambitious in work, which are much more outstanding and positive. Along with the increasing number of female occupations at the management level, Hong Kong women are even positively described as "career women" and "tough women".

Present 
The negative usage of gong nui began in 2005 when several fights and discussions started online. In February 2005, a Hong Kong girl identified as "Jenny" complained about her boyfriend for not paying $63.8 for snacks on online forum, which is later known as the "63.8 Incident". After the posts, a lot of Internet users negatively commented and responded to Jenny's behaviour, which led to an argumentative conflict between Jenny, her few supporters and attackers. "Gong nui" was then used to describe Jenny. This word does not represent all women in Hong Kong but being used to describe all the women who are arrogant, proud and shallow.

The word "Hong Kong Girls" was coined online and there are several main forums either defending or attacking this phenomenon.

The "63.8" Incident" 
The Hong Kong girl, Jenny, posted their story on the online forum, she.com and let netizens comment on it.

Jenny 2005-02-11 12:08我去citysuper買左幾十蚊野，但我男友眼白白睇著我俾錢都唔幫我俾，我覺得佢幾cheap<<We went to citysuper and bought things for a few bucks. My boyfriend just watched me pay but did not pay for me. I think he is quite cheap.>>Jenny 2005-02-11 12:29我買左幾包零食，佢都有份食同俾意見，跟著就排隊俾錢喇，咁個cashier話$63.8，咁我就好自然Q埋雙手等佢俾錢喇，點知佢好似無意識咁，郁都唔郁，咁我扮攞銀包出黎等佢醒目下喇，佢都仲係咁，我咪自己俾law…. 雖然買野之前餐飯&買野之後齣戲都係佢俾錢，(d零食都係睇戲時食，佢都有份食ga ma) 我都係同佢開始左無耐，真係要諗清楚同唔同佢一齊呀! 總之$63.8就睇清楚佢喇<<I bought a few packs of snacks. He also gave his opinion on what snacks to choose and what he would be eating. Then we queued to pay. The cashier said HKD$63.8, so I naturally folded my arms and waited for him to pay. However, he seemed to have no awareness and did not move at all. Then I pretended to take my wallet out and hoped that he would be smart enough to pay. But he was still like doing nothing, so I had to pay myself… Although he had paid for the meal and the movie tickets before we went to supermarket, (the snacks are for the movie, and he would also eat). I just started dating him for a short time. I think I had to re-consider if I had to be with him! Anyways, I see clearly who he is with $63.8.>>

Situation 
"Gong Nui" come from the phrase "Hong Kong’s girl". Originally, it is a neutral phrase. But after many Hong Kong internet forum users use this word to describe the females they met in Hong Kong which are materialistic, snobbish, superficial, self-centered and selfish, this word become a negative phrase. There are no formal characteristics to describe "Gong Nui". According to "Kong Girls and Lang Mo: teen perceptions of emergent gender stereotypes in Hong Kong", respondents suggest that "Gong Nui" always expects others to comply, full of vanity, bad-tempered and materialistic. Although this phrase normally addresses specific individuals, it becomes a representative of Hong Kong females’ characteristic when comparing with other place females. According to research, 50% of the respondents say that it is common to find characteristics of Kong Girls among Hong Kong female.

Sometime, "Gong Nui" is used to mention a lady which is combined of "gold worshipper" and "Princess Sickness". "Gold worshipper" means the workers who dig gold. In this case, it means female which consider money as a measure of all standards of behaviour. "Princess Sickness" is a popular slang expression closely related to the "by imperial decree" attitude. In the eventual development of the "Gong Nui" stereotype, "Gong Nui" becomes synonymous with women with "princess sickness", those who act as if they were princesses waiting for others to serve them.

People may think that it is a phrase that only males use it to belittle females, but some females also use this phrase to label another female. They think that those "Gong Nui" will give Hong Kong female a bad reputation. They make efforts to avoid themselves not to be assigned as "Gong Nui", thus highlighting gender as a relevant category in the number of cross-China border marriages between Hong Kong men and Mainland Chinese women is increasing. The number of cross-border marriages between Hong Kong residents and Mainland Chinese has risen tenfold from 1995 to 2005, accounting for more than one-third of registered marriages involving Hong Kong residents in 2005.

The reason that people labels "Gong Nui" as a negative representative is not only because they hate those characteristics. They want to express a positive image that females should be: Females should not be materialistic, snobbish, superficial, self-centered and selfish. Actually, it is an emergent gender stereotypes in Hong Kong. Not only “Kong Girl”, “Lang Mo” can also be an example. Although there are half of the respondents think that “Lang Mo” is positive in the research, "Lang Mo" are criticised for using their sexy bodies as a form of currency. Both groups of females are labelled because they violate social expectations of how good girls should behave.

"Gender stereotypes are not created in a vacuum, but rather emerge from within a particular sociohistorical context in which social participants position themselves and others in salient ways." Hong Kong is an international city, but the main gender stereotype still comes from China. For example, "Men are breadwinners; women are homemakers". According to the research of the Women’s Commission, the results showed that the community, men and women alike, still considered generally that women should be responsible for housework.

In the past, Chinese female was expected to be a housewife and male is expected to work outside. At that time, male earning more money to fulfill the need of the family are their responsibility. It is normal that femals want a rich male to confirm a stable life. Female can be accepted to be snobbish and superficial when choosing a companion. Using other words, it is the only life indemnification to their future.

But nowadays, females have relatively more chance to work and are financial independence from males. So, more people expect that females should not be same as the old day. They can afford their own consumption and don't need to focus on male property. If females think that the male should be rich and pay all the thing, they will be labelled as greedy or "Gold digger".

But in another word, because females are financial independence from males, they can have more freedom in their future. They can choose not to marry and maintain single until an ideal male appearing, but not control by family and society. Consider higher financial ability and education of females, it is normal that female hope a more higher – quality companion, surely property is one of the important requirements. Especially, the old Chinese gender stereotype mentions that males should have better background than female. Even the society encourages equality of male and female, this gender stereotype still stays in the person's heart.

Viewpoints on Gong Nui
Traditional media generally present a neutral view of the Gong Nui phenomenon.

Generally, men have negative feelings on 'Gong Nui'. They refuse to get married with Gong Nui as they think those girls are materialistic and above all, the girls are not looking for true love but someone who is wealthy. Besides, it is difficult to get along with Gong Nui while they are "narcissistic" according to the definition of Gong Nui. Gong Nui being self-confident, men would gradually lose their self-esteem in front of these girls and they would be afraid of having low status at home after marriage. They, therefore, do not even want to have a relationship with Gong Nui.
 Casting gong nui as undesirable woman
Most of the online forum users recognise gong nui as undesirable and greedy women, who even represent a bad image of Hong Kong girls. 都未見過一個咁物質的女人,影衰我地d女仔呀…<<Haven't seen a such materialistic woman, badly reflected on us girls.>>q埋手等人俾錢?不如你搵人包起你算啦<<Folding arms and waiting for somebody to pay? Why don't you find somebody to keep you?>>這位小姐一定是拜金主義者<<This lady must be a gold worshipper.>>jenny, […] 嗰少少錢都同你bf計, 唔怪得之d男人覺得香港d女人貪錢啦! […] 個個月LV Gucci咁買比個gf 你去搵過嗰d男人做bf啦<<Jenny…bean-counting that little bit of money with your boyfriend, no wonder those men think Hong Kong women are greedy!…Buying LV and Gucci for girlfriend every month. Why don't you find those kind of men to be your boyfriend?>>
 Positioning themselves as disadvantaged stakeholders: Men
可唔可以介紹比我識呀? 好想識佢 防下都好嘛, 一陣追個個係佢咪弊?<<Can you introduce her to me? I really want to meet her for prevention. What if the one I'm flirting is her? That would be terrible.>>有時真係好驚 d女仔同你拍拖 究竟真係鍾意你 定為左你d錢?!<<Sometimes I'm really scared. Are girls falling in love with you or your money?>>
 Positioning themselves as disadvantaged stakeholders: Women
Among the attackers, men expressed their fear of meeting gong nui while women expressed their anger on how gong nui reflects a bad and terrible image of other Hong Kong women.  本人是女性-有這種像jenny的人,影衰晒d香港女性… 難怪香港男性上大陸找女伴…<<I am a female- Seeing this kind of woman like Jenny, badly projecting Hong Kong female. No wonder Hong Kong male find partners in mainland…>>呢個女人簡直丟晒我o地同性o既面~點解仲夠膽post出o黎? 香港有部份女士到今時今日仲自視過高，唔怪之男士們開始北上尋妻啦~<<This woman totally made us females lose face. Why do you still have guts to post it? Some of the Hong Kong women nowadays are still seeing themselves high. No wonder men start to search for wives up north.>>
 Comparing gong nui to women in other countries
People also compare gong nui to women in other countries, for example Taiwan and South East Asia. Hong Kong men believe Hong Kong women do not have the appropriate manners that a wife or a girlfriend should have. 我既愛妃乃香港溝台灣種既 ….. 溫柔賢淑 係絕佳妻子 ……..係澳洲識既 大家真係咪係HK 溫食la …… 上大陸la ….包你地有意外收穫 …..我有好多朋友都係上邊識到D非大戶出身 但行出來氣質絕不差於大家閨秀ge女子 最重要係 唔單止有心去相夫 打點家頭係直頭專業地識服侍老公 專業既管家 …..同埋很知足 不貪慕名牌 ... 基本上拒地係靚到 咩著係身都係名牌<<My beloved concubine is a mix of Hong Kong and Taiwan…gentle and virtuous…is the best criteria of being a wife…I met her in Australia. You all should stop searching for women in Hong Kong…Why don’t go for mainland? I guarantee you will find good catches…I have many friends meeting women in mainland who are not from rich families, but presentable and their manners are no worse than those from rich families. The most important point is, not only are they good at helping husbands, but also professionally taking care of families and serving husbands…And they are contented with no greed in high-end brands…Basically they are so beautiful to put on any brands of goods.>>小弟內子乃緬甸華僑, 各位有興趣試試東南亞女子, 小弟覺得佢地相對比較純同溫柔體貼, 而且通常華僑都有d米, 但係又唔會話好好名牌, 仲會同你慳家<<My wife is a Burmese Chinese. If you are interested, I recommend you to try searching for South East Asian women. I think they are comparatively more pure, gentle and caring. Also Chinese are always rather wealthy, but they are not addicted with brand name goods, and even save money for you.>>However, the truth is that there is also existence of "Gong nui", narcissistic women in many countries. They are merely not publicised and talked widespread by people.

In most cases, women in Hong Kong regard the "Gong nui" label as offensive. Some of them nowadays have high education level and income, as a result, they would simply want their partner to have as same social status as they have. From their point of view, all they want is a stable future and the sense of security instead of money or material stuff. Though most of the comments are negative and attacking Jenny's behaviour, there are also few online users agreeing with Jenny's viewpoints and defending women's demand to feel how men actually care about them.

 Defending women's behaviour
jenny, 算啦, 佢地唔明我地why 會介意??? 唔係貪金錢,,, 而係想體驗佢有幾緊自己… 仲有, 唔好再係呢度講啦,, 會激死自己…..blessｕ.<<Jenny, let it go. They don't understand why we care. We don't care about the money, but we want to feel how they care about us. Also, don't talk here anymore. You will be irritated…Bless you.>>

Reason 
Consumerism is a serious phenomenon in Hong Kong, due to the fact that Hong Kong is an international city. No one cares how people work hard at the back of success, but only how you superficially behave gloriously. According to "After the Binge, the Hangover" Research, there are more than 50% Hong Kong respondents have brand new clothes with hangtags in their closets that have never been worn, because they have to continuously buy clothes in order to show that he or she lives well under this international city. Gong nui is definitely one of the respondents and consumers. Consumerism surely relates to materialism. In Hong Kong, many loan advertisements are existed on the TV show and they promote that Loan can help people pay off the credit card. Some even say loan can help people travelling and shopping freely. Normally, they hide the consequence and set the step of loan more earlier. The media of Hong Kong encourages people to consume, which actually encourage materialism too.

The education level of Hong Kong women has been increasing, that more and more women in Hong Kong are getting equal opportunities of higher education as men. Women can be more independent nowadays, but the old Chinese gender stereotype is still staying in Hong Kong. Although equality of male and female is encouraged in Hong Kong, the old thinking "husband should be richer than wife" is still not eliminated. An asymmetric gender stereotype change is happening. The right of the females is increasing without the responsibility. Nowadays, female can be financial independent from males, it means that they don't need males to afford their consumption. They can choose a male not only because he is rich but more about love, personality...  But the old thinking "husband should richer than wife" encourage females to choose a male which more property. According to the research of the Women's Commission, more women considered objective factors such as education level and social status to be among the major considerations for choosing a spouse.

Additionally, the population proportion in Hong Kong also accounts for the reason why there is an existence of the term of gong nui. According to the Census and Statistics Department of Hong Kong government, the female population in Hong Kong in 2017 is 4.012 million, while male population is merely 3.397 million. The gender population in Hong Kong is rather imbalanced. Moreover, Hong Kong men start to search for women in other countries instead of in Hong Kong, leading to more and more Hong Kong unmarried women in excess. That is why Hong Kong women become more materialistic and arrogant, because they also do not aim for Hong Kong men within Hong Kong society.

Gong nui VS Gong nam 
In addition to Gong nui, there is also an existence of the term "Gong nam", referring to a typical type of Hong Kong boys. While the online platform criticises gong nui as unruly, obstinate, materialistic, picky and have princess sickness, gong nui also criticises gong nam for an equal number of shortcomings. There is an article listing 81 faults of Hong Kong boys, including stingy, horny, immature and appear to be very weak in a relationship . In 2013 October, one Hong Kong girl slapped her boyfriend publicly in the street. The man kneeled on the ground, apologised and hoped for a forgiveness from his girlfriend. The video later was uploaded online to many of the online platforms and become widespread. On one hand, people criticise the girl acting exactly like a Gong nui, however, on the other hand, people also blame the man for being coward and losing male's faces, which refers to the characteristics of a Gong nam.

The conflicts usually start with a contradiction of generosity and narrow-mind, material and body. Gong nui believe men should appropriately do a better work and be generous on the aspect of money, while gong nam criticise women in Hong Kong over-rank themselves.

See also 
 Kong Boys and Kong Girls
 Culture of Hong Kong
 Internet culture
 Women in Hong Kong

References 

Culture of Hong Kong